This is a list of equipment of the Chilean Army currently in use. It includes small arms, combat vehicles, artillery, transport vehicles and aircraft.

Equipment

Handguns

Battle / assault rifles

Sniper rifles

Submachine guns

Machine guns

Shotguns

Grenade launchers

Anti-material weapons

Mortars

Air defense systems

Howitzers

Self-propelled artillery

Rocket artillery

Tanks

Armoured infantry vehicles

Light utility vehicles

Watercraft

Aircraft

See also
 List of current equipment of the Chilean Air Force
 List of active ships of the Chilean Navy
 List of active Chile military aircraft
 List of current equipment of the Chilean Marine Corps

References

Chilean Army
List
Chilean Army
Chilean military-related lists